Baypointe is an at-grade light rail station located in the center median of Tasman Drive at its intersection with Baypointe Parkway, after which the station is named, in San Jose, California. The station is owned by Santa Clara Valley Transportation Authority (VTA) and is served by the Blue Line and the Orange Line of the VTA light rail system. Baypointe station is the current northern terminus for the Blue Line.

Baypointe station is differentiated from other VTA light rail stations as it features three tracks and two island platforms. Blue Line trains stop and reverse direction on the center track, while Orange Line trains use the two outer tracks. Passengers can make a cross platform transfer with either line in any direction.

History

Baypointe was designed to be a terminal/transfer station and consequently has a unique design with three tracks and two island platforms. The center track is a pocket track that allows trains to park and reverse direction off the mainline. There is an additional  of pocket track east of the station allowing trains to be stored in the median of Tasman Drive.

When the Tasman West extension opened in December 1999, Baypointe station was the terminal and transfer station for what was then the "Baypointe–Mountain View" and the "Baypointe–Santa Teresa" lines. In May 2001, when the Tasman East light rail project (segment 1) extended the system to I-880/Milpitas station (later renamed Alder station), the center track of Baypointe station served as the northern terminus for the "Baypointe–Santa Teresa" line and became a through station for the "Mountain View–I-880/Milpitas" line. In June 2004, when the Tasman East/Capitol extension opened, the line from Mountain View was changed to terminate on the center track of Baypointe station and the line from Santa Teresa continued eastward to Alum Rock station.

In August 2005, VTA reconfigured its light rail lines upon completion of the Vasona light rail extension (now part of today's Green Line). As part of this reconfiguration, Tasman station became the transfer point between the newly formed Alum Rock–Santa Teresa and Mountain View–Winchester lines. The center platform of Baypointe station would not see regular use for about five years.

The center platform was reactivated in 2010 for a VTA experiment in offering express light rail service on the Alum Rock-Santa Teresa line. These trains operated nonstop from Ohlone-Chynoweth to San Jose Convention Center. The three northbound morning and southbound afternoon trains used Baypointe as their terminal. The service proved unpopular and was discontinued in October 2018.

On December 28, 2019, the VTA system received a major reconfiguration in preparation for the opening of the Silicon Valley BART extension. The Orange Line was established as an east-west line between Mountain View and Alum Rock, using Baypointe as a through station on the outer tracks. At the same time, the Blue Line was truncated and used the center platform of Baypointe as its terminus. A timed cross-platform transfer is offered between Orange and Blue Line trains at Baypointe.

Service

Location
Baypointe station is located in the median of Tasman Drive just west of Baypointe Parkway in northern San Jose, California.  The address is 97 East Tasman Drive.

Station layout

References

Santa Clara Valley Transportation Authority light rail stations
Santa Clara Valley Transportation Authority bus stations
Railway stations in San Jose, California
Railway stations in the United States opened in 1999
1999 establishments in California